Posidonia ostenfeldii is a species of seagrass that occurs in the southern waters of Australia.

Description
A species of Posidonia. A perennial rhizomatous herb that appears as clumps on sand in marine habitat. It is found at depths between 1 and 15 metres. The leaf blades are 6–12 mm wide.

Distribution
This species is found in waters around the southern coast of Australia.  Posidonia ostenfeldii is recorded at the edge of the Esperance Plains, the Archipelago of the Recherche, at the southern coast of Southwest Australia.

Taxonomy
This species is contained by the Posidoniaceae family, one of eight occurring in southern Australia. The ninth member, Posidonia oceanica, is found in the mediterranean sea. Several related species within Posidonia are described as the Posidonia ostenfeldii complex.

References

External links

ostenfeldii